John Henry Richardson (born 8 May 1935 in Pretoria, Transvaal) is a former South African cricketer active from 1959 to 1961 who played for North Eastern Transvaal.

Richardson appeared in twenty-two first-class matches as a right-hand batsman and wicketkeeper. He scored 785 runs with a highest score of 72.

His son Dave played Test cricket for South Africa in the 1990s.

References

1935 births
South African cricketers
Living people
Northerns cricketers
Cricketers from Pretoria